The 2022 South Carolina Secretary of State election was held on November 8, 2022, to elect the Secretary of State of South Carolina.  Incumbent Republican Mark Hammond was seeking another term in office against Democratic challenger Rosemounda Peggy Butler. after defeating an opponent in the Republican primary. The last Democratic Secretary of State of South Carolina was John T. Campbell in 1991. Primary elections were held on June 14, 2022.  Hammond defeated his Democratic opponent and retained his seat.

Republican primary

Candidates

 Mark Hammond, incumbent secretary of state
 Keith Blanford, businessman and perennial candidate

Results

Democratic primary

Candidates

Declared
Rosemounda Peggy Butler, former West Columbia councilwoman

General election

Predictions

Results

References

Secretary of State
South Carolina